The Ministry of Foreign Affairs (MRE) also known as the Chancellery, is the Cabinet position of the Government of Colombia responsible for the international relations of Colombia through its diplomatic missions abroad by formulating foreign policy relevant to the matters of the State. It is equivalent to the foreign affairs ministries of other countries.

Secretaries and Ministers of Foreign Affairs

Republic of Colombia (1819—1831)

Republic of New Granada (1832—1858)

Granadine Confederation (1858—1863)

United States of Colombia (1863—1886)

Republic of Colombia (1886—present)

References

 
Ministries established in 1821
1821 establishments in Gran Colombia
Colombia